Mikuru is a feminine Japanese given name. Notable people with the name include:

, Japanese darts player
, Japanese gravure idol
, Japanese mixed martial artist

Fictional characters
, a character in the light novel series Haruhi Suzumiya

Japanese feminine given names